Morris Herman DeGroot (June 8, 1931 – November 2, 1989) was an American statistician.

Biography
Born in Scranton, Pennsylvania, DeGroot graduated from Roosevelt University and earned master's and doctor's degrees from the University of Chicago. DeGroot joined Carnegie Mellon in 1957 and became a University Professor, the school's highest faculty position.

He was the founding editor of the review journal Statistical Science.

Academic works
He wrote six books, edited four volumes and authored over one hundred papers.  Most of his research was on the theory of rational decision-making under uncertainty.  His Optimal Statistical Decisions, published in 1970, is still recognized as one of the great books in the field. His courses on statistical decision theory taught at Carnegie-Mellon influenced Edward C. Prescott and Robert Lucas, Jr., influential figures in the development of new classical macroeconomics and real business-cycle theory. DeGroot's undergraduate text, Probability and Statistics, published in 1975, is widely recognized as a classic textbook.

Books
 DeGroot, M.H. & M.J. Schervish (2011), Probability and Statistics, 4th Ed, Pearson, 
 DeGroot, M.H. & M.J. Schervish (2011), Student Solutions Manual for Probability and Statistics, Pearson, 

 DeGroot, M.H. (1989), Probability and Statistics, 2nd Ed, Addison-Wesley, 
 DeGroot, Morris H., Optimal Statistical Decisions. Wiley Classics Library. 2004. (Originally published (1970) by McGraw-Hill.) .
 DeGroot, M.H., S.E. Fienberg & J.B. Kadane (1994), Statistics and the Law (1994), Wiley,

Awards and honors
DeGroot was elected fellow of the American Statistical Association,  the Institute of Mathematical Statistics, the International Statistical Institute, the Econometric Society and the American Association for the Advancement of Science.

ISBA's DeGroot Prize is named for him.

See also
 Becker–DeGroot–Marschak method

References

Further reading
 "Biography of Morris H. DeGroot", Statistical Science, Vol. 6, No. 1. (Feb., 1991), pp. 3–14.
 "Morris DeGroot, 58, A Statistics Professor", Obituary, The New York Times, November 3, 1989.

External links
 

Fellows of the American Statistical Association
American statisticians
Fellows of the Econometric Society
Fellows of the American Association for the Advancement of Science
Econometricians
American social scientists
American business theorists
Public administration scholars
Carnegie Mellon University faculty
Fellows of the Institute of Mathematical Statistics
1931 births
1989 deaths
Place of death missing
Bayesian econometricians
20th-century American mathematicians
20th-century American economists